Andronino is a rural locality (a village) in Novlenskoye Rural Settlement, Vologodsky District, Vologda Oblast, Russia. The population was 5 as of 2002.

Geography 
It is located 73 km northwest of Vologda. Oleshevo is the nearest rural locality.

References 

Rural localities in Vologodsky District